Kõverlaid (alternate name: Keverilaid) is a small, moraine-based Baltic Sea island belonging to the country of Estonia.

Kõverlaid covers approximately 29 hectares and lies approximately eleven kilometers from the coast of the island of Hiiumaa, four kilometers west of the island of Kõrgelaid, and approximately three kilometers northwest of the island of Ahelaid in the small Väinameri Sea, or West Estonian archipelago. Kõverlaid is, with a number of small islands and islets, part of the Hiiumaa Islets Nature Reserve. Kõverlaid is administered by Hiiu County.

Despite its small size, the island boasts numerous flora and fauna; pine, birch and juniper stands are abundant and wild boar, red foxes and moose are found on the island. The island is also an important breeding area for many bird species.

See also
 List of islands of Estonia

References

External links
Hiiumaa Islets Nature Reserve
View of a beach on Kõverlaid

Estonian islands in the Baltic
Hiiumaa Parish